Tera Mera Tedha Medha (Hindi: तेरा मेरा टेढ़ा मेढ़ा English: Your my sinuous) is an Indian 2015 Bollywood romantic comedy film directed by Chittaranjan Tripathy and produced by Sanjiv Chopra under the Nakshatra Slim Films banner. The film was released on 11 September 2015. The film didn't performed very well at the box office.

Cast
Saroj Parida
Rahul Bagga
Geetika Tyagi
Rajesh Sharma
Reema Vorah
Chittaranjan Tripathy
Neeraj Sood

Plot
Tera Mera Tedha Medha is quirky-topsy-turvy romantic comedy influenced by Planetary Disposition. It is a love story of two young struggling painters.

Soundtrack

References

External links
 
 

2010s Hindi-language films
2015 films
Indian romantic comedy films
Films shot in Mumbai
2015 romantic comedy films